The Clausius–Duhem inequality is a way of expressing the second law of thermodynamics that is used in continuum mechanics. This inequality is particularly useful in determining whether the constitutive relation of  a material is thermodynamically allowable.

This inequality is a statement concerning the irreversibility of natural processes, especially when energy dissipation is involved. It was named after the German physicist Rudolf Clausius and French physicist Pierre Duhem.

Clausius–Duhem inequality in terms of the specific entropy 
The Clausius–Duhem inequality can be expressed in integral form as

In differential form the Clausius–Duhem inequality can be written as

Clausius–Duhem inequality in terms of specific internal energy 
The inequality can be expressed in terms of the internal energy as

This inequality incorporates the balance of energy and the balance of linear and angular momentum into the expression for the Clausius–Duhem inequality.

Dissipation 
The quantity 

is called the dissipation which is defined as the rate of internal entropy production per unit volume times the absolute temperature.  Hence the Clausius–Duhem inequality is also called the dissipation inequality.  In a real material, the dissipation is always greater than zero.

See also 
 Entropy
 Second law of thermodynamics

References

External links 
 Memories of Clifford Truesdell by Bernard D. Coleman, Journal of Elasticity, 2003.
 Thoughts on Thermomechanics by Walter Noll, 2008.

Continuum mechanics